Turnagain Pass (el. ) is a mountain pass just south of the municipal limits of Anchorage, Alaska. It is located in the northeastern part of Kenai Peninsula Borough. The pass marks the highest point on the Seward Highway at approximately milepost 70. Traveling north, the Seward Highway descends into the Anchorage bowl and begins to round the Turnagain Arm.

The pass is a popular winter recreation area for skiers, snowshoers, and snowmobilers. The designated recreation area is located within the Chugach National Forest, which maintains the Chugach National Forest Avalanche Information Center, whose forecasting area is centered on Turnagain Pass.

References

External links

Landforms of Kenai Peninsula Borough, Alaska
Mountain passes of Alaska